The Oceania Handball Nations Championship was the official competition for senior national handball teams of Oceania, and took place every two years. In addition to crowning the Oceania champions, the tournament also served as a qualifying tournament for the World Handball Championship. Also played is the Pacific Handball Cup where states of other countries such as New Caledonia, Tahiti and Wallis and Futuna (France) and Marshall Islands, Guam and America Samoa (USA) who are ineligible for International Handball Federation world championship events, compete against member nations.

Men's tournament

Summary

Medal table

Participating nations

Women's tournament

Summary

Medal table

Participating nations

Notes

External links
Handball Oceania Archive on Todor66.com

References

Handball competitions in Oceania
 
Oceanian championships
Recurring sporting events established in 1994
Recurring sporting events disestablished in 2018